MS20 or variation, may refer to:

 Korg MS-20, a music synthesizer
 Mississippi Highway 20 (MS 20)
 Mordaunt-Short MS20, a loudspeaker
 Murashige and Skoog medium MS20, a plant growth medium

 Soyuz MS-20, a space tourism mission

See also

Manuscript 20 (MS 20)
 Huntington MS 20
 Genealogies from Jesus College MS 20
 
 
 
 
 MS 2000 (disambiguation)
 MS-200 (disambiguation)
 MS2 (disambiguation)
 20 (disambiguation)
 MS (disambiguation)